State Highway 266 (SH 266) is a state highway in the U.S. state of Colorado. SH 266's western terminus is at U.S. Route 50 (US 50) and SH 71 in Rocky Ford, and the eastern terminus is at SH 109 near Cheraw.

Route description
SH 266 runs , starting at a junction with  US 50 in Rocky Ford.  The highway goes east, crosses the Arkansas River and ends at a junction with  SH 109 near Cheraw.

Major intersections

References

External links

266
Transportation in Otero County, Colorado